Thongwa Dönden (1416–1453) or Tongwa Donden, was the sixth Karmapa, head of the Kagyu School of Tibetan Buddhism.

Thongwa Dönden was born in Ngomto Shakyam near Karma Gon in Kham. He was recognized during his first visit at the Karma Gon monastery and joined the monastery to be taught by the Shamarpa.

Up to then the Kagyu lineage had mainly given emphasis on meditation and considered rituals and prayers of lesser importance and therefore it had been neglected. Thongwa Dönden therefore set out to write many prayers and form many rituals. He was also very active with the printing and copying of Buddhist texts and the founding of a Buddhist university. Thongwa strengthened the lineage by having the Shangpa and Shijay lineage join their lineage and making sure that the different teachings were compatible with each other.

References

Further reading
 

 Lama Kunsang, Lama Pemo, Marie Aubèle (2012). History of the Karmapas: The Odyssey of the Tibetan Masters with the Black Crown. Snow Lion Publications, Ithaca, New York. .

External links
The Sixth Karmapa, The Karmapa, Official Website of the 17th Gyalwang Karmapa

1416 births
1453 deaths
6
15th-century Tibetan people